IQ are a British neo-progressive rock band founded by Mike Holmes and Martin Orford in 1981 following the dissolution of their original band The Lens. Although the band have never enjoyed major commercial success and had several lineup changes, IQ have built up a loyal following over the years and are still active as of 2022, currently with the original recording line-up (with the exception of Orford). In 2021/22, IQ performed a series of concerts in the UK and Europe celebrating their 40th anniversary.

Neo-progressive movement 
IQ were one of a number of British bands formed during the early 1980s, including Marillion, Pendragon, Twelfth Night, Pallas and Solstice, that continued with the progressive rock style forsaken by 1970s bands such as Genesis and Yes. The music press coined the phrase neo-progressive to describe these bands, often accusing them of simply copying the styles of other bands. This accusation has been strenuously denied by Martin Orford, who is against the use of the term "neo progressive" and claims the band have wide-ranging and eclectic selection of musical influences. Paul Stump's History of Progressive Rock, while affirming the band's categorization as neo-progressive, argued that IQ "did at least offer a more individual palette which, while just as derivative [as Marillion] in its way, gave the impression that the choice of arrangements was indivisible from the choice of notes played - that the similarities with older bands arose accidentally from their own personal approach to music." [emphasis in original]

Line-up 
From 1982, the line-up consisted of Peter Nicholls (vocals), Mike Holmes (guitar), Martin Orford (keyboards), Paul Cook (not to be confused with the Sex Pistols' drummer of the same name) (drums), and Tim Esau (bass). Nicholls left in July 1985 to form a new band, Niadem's Ghost, and was replaced by Paul (P. L.) Menel, but subsequently returned in 1990. Nicholls also created the cover art for most of the albums on which he appears. In early 2005, member Paul Cook left the band and was replaced on drums by Andy Edwards (ex Robert Plant drummer). On 20 July 2007, Martin Orford announced that he was leaving IQ and he was replaced by Mark Westworth from prog-rock band Darwin's Radio. As of late 2009, Paul Cook has returned to replace Andy Edwards. On 7 October 2010, Mark Westworth announced on the band's official web site that he would be leaving the band and his final appearance with IQ was on 11 December 2010. On 1 January 2011, the band announced that Westworth's replacement on keyboards would be Neil Durant, from instrumental prog-fusion band Sphere³. On 7 January 2011, bassist of 19 years John Jowitt announced on the band's website that he had left the band, and that his last appearance with the band had also been the concert on 11 December 2010. He was replaced by original bassist Tim Esau in January 2011.

Musical style 

The band's musical style, especially earlier in their career, was reminiscent of Peter Gabriel and Steve Hackett era Genesis because of singer Peter Nicholls' vocal and stage-presence similarities to Gabriel and keyboardist Martin Orford's grandiose keyboarding. However, guitarist Mike Holmes' role was far more assertive in the band, giving them a harder edge musically. After Nicholls' departure, the band's style became increasingly commercial and radio-friendly — albeit without much success — on Nomzamo (1987) and Are You Sitting Comfortably? (1989), although each album still featured some progressive rock-style tracks. Beginning with the return of Nicholls on 1993's Ever, the band returned to its prog rock roots, with longer tracks featuring intricate arrangements and complex musicianship.

Personnel

Members 
Current members
 Mike Holmes – guitars, keyboards (1981–present), backing vocals (2011–present)
 Peter Nicholls – lead and backing vocals (1981–1985, 1990–present)
 Tim Esau – bass guitar, bass pedals (1981–1989, 2011–present), backing vocals (2011–present)
 Paul Cook – drums (1982–2005, 2009–present)
 Neil Durant – keyboards (2010–present)

Former members
 Martin Orford – keyboards, backing vocals (1981–2007)
 Mark Ridout – drums (1981–1982)
 Paul Menel – vocals (1985–1989)
 Les 'Ledge' Marshall – bass guitar (1989-1991)
 John Jowitt – bass guitar, backing vocals (1991–2011)
 Andy Edwards – drums (2005–2009)
 Mark Westworth – keyboards (2007–2010)

Lineups 
N.B. bold = lineup change; * = returning band member

Timeline

Discography

Albums
 Seven Stories into Eight (1982 demo cassette)
 Tales from the Lush Attic (1983)
 The Wake (1985)
 Nomzamo (1987)
 Are You Sitting Comfortably? (1989)
 Ever (1993)
 Subterranea (1997)
 Seven Stories into '98 (1998)
 The Seventh House (2000)
 Dark Matter (2004)
 Frequency (2009)
 The Road of Bones (2014)
 The Archive Collection: Tales from a Dark Christmas (2017) 
 Resistance (2019)

Compilations
 Nine in a Pond is Here (1985) ("official bootleg" of demos etc., CD version is abridged)
 The Lost Attic (1999) (rarities)
 Limited edition Frequency Tour CD 1 (2008) (rarities and live tracks)
 Limited edition Frequency Tour CD 2 (2008) (rarities and live tracks)
 The Archive Collection (2022) (all archive releases from 2003 to 2017 - plus)

Live albums
 Living Proof (1986)
 J'ai Pollette d'Arnu (1991) (b-sides and live tracks)
 Forever Live (1996)
 Subterranea: The Concert (2000)
 The Archive Collection: IQ20 (2003) ("official bootleg" of live concert)
 The Wake: Live at De Boerderij (2010)
 The Archive Collection: IQ30 (2012) ("official bootleg" of live concert)
 The Archive Collection: Live on The Road of Bones (2016)
 The Archive Collection: A Show of Resistance (2020)
 The Archive Collection #11: IQ40 - Forty years of Prog Nonsense (2022) ("official bootleg" of live concert)

Videos
 Forever Live (VHS/CD set 1996, DVD set 2007)
 Subterranea: The Concert (DVD, 2000)
 IQ20 - The Twentieth Anniversary Show (DVD 2004)
 Live from London (DVD, recorded 13 May 1985 in London, 2005)
 IQ Stage (DVD, 2006)
 Forever Live (DVD, 2007)
 The Wake in Concert (DVD, 2010)
 Scrape Across the Sky (Blu-ray, 2017)
 Live Like This (Blu-ray, 2021)

Singles 
 "Barbell Is In" (1984)
 "Corners" (1985)
 "Passing Strangers" (1987)
 "Promises (As the Years Go By)" (1987)
 "Sold on You" (1989)

References

External links
Official IQ web site
The Museum of the band IQ
Collection of IQ MIDI files (archived)
 

English progressive rock groups
Musical groups established in 1981
Articles which contain graphical timelines
Vertigo Records artists
Mercury Records artists
Inside Out Music artists